William Leigh Williamson (May 11, 1909 – December 3, 1969) was a Canadian politician. He served in the Legislative Assembly of New Brunswick as member of the Liberal party from 1948 to 1952.

References

1909 births
1969 deaths
New Brunswick Liberal Association MLAs